Donnie E. Treadwell (February 27, 1923 – October 12, 2014) was an American politician. He served as a Democratic member of the Florida House of Representatives.

Life and career 
Treadwell was born in Holmes County. He attended the University of Florida.

In 1965, Treadwell was elected to the Florida House of Representatives, serving until 1966.

Treadwell died in October 2014, at the age of 91.

References 

1923 births
2014 deaths
Democratic Party members of the Florida House of Representatives
20th-century American politicians
University of Florida alumni